J. H. M. Abbott (1874 – 1953) was an Australian novelist and poet who was born in Haydonton, Murrurundi, New South Wales in 1874.

Early life
He was the eldest son of son of (Sir) Joseph Palmer Abbott and his first wife Matilda Elizabeth, née Macartney. He was educated at The King's School, Parramatta and then attended classes at the University of Sydney before returning to the family property to work as a jackaroo. He published his first verse in The Bulletin in 1897.

In January 1900 he left Australia for the Boer War where he served as a corporal in the 1st Australian Horse, and later as a second lieutenant in the Royal Field Artillery, but was invalided back to Australia in October 1900. He utilised his experiences in the war to write Tommy Cornstalk (1902), the success of which convinced him to move to London to work as a journalist.  He returned to Australia in 1909 and worked for the next 40 years as a writer of novels, poetry and prose pieces for various newspapers and periodicals.

According to Miller and Macartney, 

Abbott died in the Rydalmere Mental Hospital of vascular disease on 12 August 1953.

Bibliography

Novels
 Plain and Veldt : being studies, stories and sketches of my own people, in peace and at war (1903)
 Letters from Queer Street: being some of the correspondence of the late Mr John Mason (1908)
 The Sign of the Serpent (1910)
 Castle Vane : A Romance of Bushranging on the Upper Hunter in the Olden Days (1916)
 Sally : The Tale of a Currency Lass (1918)
 The Governor's Man (1919)
 Sydney Cove : A Romance of the First Fleet (1920)
 Ensign Calder (1922)
 Red O'Shaughnessy (1935)

Essays
 Out of the Past (1944)

Short Stories
 The King's School and Other Tales for Old Boys (1931)

Children's fiction
 The Story of William Dampier (1911)
 Dogsnose (1928)

Autobiography
 Tommy Cornstalk : Being Some Account of the Less Notable Features of the South African War from the Point of View of the Australian Ranks (1902)

References

1874 births
1953 deaths
Australian male novelists
Australian poets
Royal Field Artillery officers